"Spin Spin Sugar" is a song by English electronic band Sneaker Pimps, released in March 1997 as the fourth single from their debut studio album, Becoming X (1996). The album version is typical of the Sneaker Pimps in both style and format; there is a driving bass line produced by a synthesizer keyboard which is accompanied by a second synthesizer loop playing above it. Kelli Dayton provides the vocals.

"Spin Spin Sugar" was further popularized with the release of a speed garage remix by Armand van Helden, which is sometimes credited with breaking speed garage into the mainstream for the first time. Redbull.com included the remix in their "Honorable mentions" list of "underground UK garage classics that still sound fresh today".

Critical reception
British magazine Music Week gave the song three out of five, writing, "A faster, guitar and percussion-cluttered radio mix lacks the brooding menace of the album version, but club mixes by Van Helden and Farley & Heller, plus a new track 'Walk the Rain', will lift its chances." The Times newspaper described it as a "twitchy, dance-rock crossover song from much-fancied indie kids with attitude."

Track listings
 UK CD single
 "Spin Spin Sugar" (radio edit) – 3:34
 "Spin Spin Sugar" (album mix) – 4:20
 "Walk the Rain" – 4:58
 "How Do" – 5:01

 UK 12-inch single
 "Spin Spin Sugar" (Armand's Dark Garage mix) – 9:05
 "Walking Zero" (Tuff & Jam Unda-Vybe vocal) – 6:36
 "Walking Zero" (Tuff & Jam Unda-Vybe dub instrumental) – 6:36

Charts

Weekly charts

Year-end charts

References

1996 songs
1997 singles
2015 singles
Sneaker Pimps songs
Song recordings produced by Flood (producer)
Songs written by Chris Corner
Songs written by Liam Howe
UK garage songs